Ashtech (born Andrea Nicoletti, December 15, 1973, Italy) is an Italian producer, bass player and solo artist. His style combines original dub and urban electronica and it is characterised by the flavor of his heavy dubby bassline which features in all of his productions.
Ashtech's recent work, primarily 'Walkin Target', released in 2007 on Interchill Records Involving input from fellow producer Gaudi and vocalist Cheshire Cat (Leftfield), was very well received by the UK and US electronica/dub scene.
He has appeared at festivals such as Glade (UK) – Electric Picnic (Ireland) – Eclipse Festival – Waveform Festival (UK).

Early career
His first steps in music were originally as a DJ, approaching electronica and developing a passion for experimental music. Ashtech became an established figure in the Italian mainstream music scene, collaborating with many artists, both as a producer and as a composer, on a total of 14 albums, three of which with Almamegretta (4/4, IMAGINARIA, and Venite Venite) under BMG record label. His five-year collaboration with Almamegretta saw him touring extensively in Italy and Europe and sharing the stage with acts such as Tricky, The Wailers, Erykah Badu, Mory Kante, Compay Segundo, Groove Armada and Asian Dub Foundation.

WOP
During his last year in Italy, Ashtech collaborated with Raiz (Almamegretta's historical voice) on his first album, WOP for Universal Records and he produced the single "Wop". During the Wop tour, Ashtech decided to move to London in order to access the innovative music industry there.

"With Me"
After moving to London, Ashtech released "With Me" for the compilation album, The Dream Temple (Millennim Records), "Dub Hypnosis" for the album Continvvm Em:t Records, and "Earth Orbit" for the dub compilation Sub Signals Interchill Records. He also released his debut solo album Walkin Target, produced by Gaudi (musician) for Interchill Records. The album included four tracks featuring the vocal stylings of Cheshire Cat from Leftfield.

Meditronica
His next album was released in 2007. After remixing Raiz's album for Universal Records, he produced the new dub project Meditronica, written in collaboration with Polcari, Dub Gabriel, Raiz and Eraldo Bernocchi.

Meditronica was released worldwide in March 2009 on the London-based label, RareNoise.

Discography
 Ashtech – Walkin' Target – Interchill Records 2007

Compilation albums
 Various Artists – ONE DUB – Interchill Records 2009
 Various Artists – Sub Signals Volume 1 – Interchill Records 2006

Productions and projects
 Meditronica – Meditronica – RareNoiseRecords 2009
 Raiz – Femmena Remix – Universal Records
 Gaudi: Testa 1105 – Continvvm – Em:t Records 2005
 Various Records – The Dream Temple – Milleniumrecords
 Raiz – WOP – Phoenix 2004
 Liquor Shop – Original Musico to Gianluca Sodaro's latest movie – BMG 2004
 Mauro Pagani – Domani – NUN 2003
 Luna Rossa – Soundtrack – NUN 2003
 Almamegretta – Venite Venite – BMG 2002
 Almamegretta – Imaginaria – BMG 2001
 Polina – Remix – NUN records – 2001
 Epicentro Romano – Unic Records – 2000
 Almamegretta – 4/4 – BMG 1999
 La Squadra – Good Stuff Records 1998
 Liquor Shop – Liquor Shop – IRMA Records 1998
 Jahng – 1996

References

External links
 Ashtech's official website
 last.fm

Italian bass guitarists
Male bass guitarists
Living people
1973 births
Place of birth missing (living people)
21st-century bass guitarists
21st-century Italian male musicians